The  (TRE) is a German encyclopedia of theology and religious studies. It contains some 2000 articles in 36 volumes. The first installment was published in 1977, the last in 2004.

Genesis and editors
But in contrast to the latter, the TRE treats its subjects in an ecumenical fashion. 

The TRE was edited by fourteen main editors. The primary editor was the bishop and church historian Gerhard Müller of the Evangelical Lutheran Church in Brunswick. Until volume 12 his fellow main editor was Gerhard Krause, professor of theology at the University of Bonn.

Publication information
Gerhard Müller, Horst Balz, Gerhard Krause (eds.): Theologische Realenzyklopädie. 36 vols. De Gruyter, Berlin 1976–2004.  /  / ; Compact edition:  /

See also 
 
 
 List of encyclopedias by branch of knowledge

External links
 Official website
Index

Encyclopedias of religion
German-language encyclopedias